Central Technical High School, also known as Central Tech, is located on South Warren Street in Syracuse, New York. It was designed by Archimedes Russell, and built in 1900. At that time, it represented the latest in educational building design. Classes were first held in the school in 1903.

The building has been closed since 1975.

The school building was added to the National Register of Historic Places in 1981.

Possible reuse of the building has been discussed several times.

In 2019, plans are active to re-purpose the building as a science, technology, engineering, arts, and math school.

See also
Institute of Technology at Syracuse Central, a high school opened in 2007 adjacent to Central High School.

References

External links

A history of Syracuse Central Technical High School

Beaux-Arts architecture in New York (state)
Buildings and structures in Syracuse, New York
Defunct schools in New York (state)
National Register of Historic Places in Syracuse, New York
School buildings on the National Register of Historic Places in New York (state)
Schools in Onondaga County, New York
Syracuse City School District
1903 establishments in New York (state)